Rolf G. Fjelde  (March 15, 1926 – September 10, 2002) was an American playwright, educator and poet. Fjelde was the founding president of the Ibsen Society of America which is dedicated to promoting academic and public interest in the work of Henrik Ibsen.

Background
Rolf  G. Fjelde was born in Brooklyn, New York. His father was the sculptor, Paul Fjelde. His grandfather was the Norwegian-born sculptor Jakob Fjelde (1859–1896), who had immigrated to Minnesota in 1887. His great-aunt was Minnesota needlework artist and weaver, Pauline Fjelde. Rolf Fjelde grew up in Greenwich, Connecticut and graduated from Yale University. After receiving an M.F.A. from Columbia University, he received fellowships to study in Heidelberg and Copenhagen.

Career
In 1954, Fjelde joined his father, a Professor of Art, on the faculty of Pratt Institute in Brooklyn, accepting a position in the Humanities Department, where he was a Professor of Literature until his retirement in 1997. Rolf Fjelde won the  Pratt Institute Distinguished Teacher Award for 1996.

Rolf  Fjelde published two volumes of poetry, in 1955 and 1962, and in 1965, published the first volume of his Ibsen translations. This began the  translating career that culminated in Ibsen: The Complete Major Prose Plays (1978) and Peer Gynt (1980). In 1991, the King of Norway honored Rolf  Fjelde for his translations by awarding him the St. Olav's Medal. Two years later, The American Academy of Arts and Letters presented Rolf  Fjelde with its Award in Literature.

During 1978, the Ibsen Sesquecentennial Symposium celebrating the occasion of the 150th anniversary of Ibsen's birth, took place on  the Brooklyn campus of Pratt Institute. This was the beginning of the Ibsen Society of America of which Rolf  Fjelde was elected as founding President. He held the office for fifteen years. Rolf  Fjelde also founded the publication, Ibsen News and Comment, the newsletter and journal of The Ibsen Society of America, which has been published annually since 1980.

Selected works

Plays produced
One Simple Flower (1956) 
Port Harmony (1957) 
Switzerland (1967)
The Rope Walk (1968) 
Rafferty One by One (1970) 
The Bernini Look (1981)

Books published
Washington (1955)
The Imaged Word (1963) 
Ibsen: A Collection of Critical Essays (1965) 
Ibsen: Four Major Plays: Volume I (1965)
Ibsen: Four Major Plays: Volume II (1970)
Ibsen: The Complete Major Prose Plays (1978)
Peer Gynt (1980)

References

External links
The Ibsen Society of America Official Website
Ibsen News and Comment Website

1920s births
1995 deaths
American people of Norwegian descent
Writers from Brooklyn
Yale University alumni
Columbia University School of the Arts alumni
American male poets
Recipients of the St. Olav's Medal
American male dramatists and playwrights
20th-century American poets
20th-century American dramatists and playwrights
20th-century American male writers